1885 was the 99th season of cricket in England since the foundation of Marylebone Cricket Club (MCC). It was the third in succession in which Nottinghamshire was proclaimed the champion county.

Champion County

 Nottinghamshire

Playing record (by county)

Leading batsmen (qualification 20 innings)

Leading bowlers (qualification 1,000 balls)

Notable events
 1 June – Kent captain Lord Harris writes a letter to Lancashire concerning the "unfair" bowling of Nash and Crossland and decides not to play Lancashire unless they refrain from employing those two bowlers – the refusal is maintained even when the pair drop out.
 On 17 July, Johnny Briggs and Dick Pilling playing for Lancashire against Surrey set a record stand for the tenth wicket of 173, which stands until 1899.

Notes
An unofficial seasonal title sometimes proclaimed by consensus of media and historians prior to December 1889 when the official County Championship was constituted.  Although there are ante-dated claims prior to 1873, when residence qualifications were introduced, it is only since that ruling that any quasi-official status can be ascribed. 
The return match between Kent and Lancashire was cancelled because Lord Harris objected to the bowling of two Lancashire players

References

Annual reviews
 James Lillywhite’s Cricketers’ Annual (Red Lilly), Lillywhite, 1886
 John Wisden's Cricketers' Almanack 1886

External links
 CricketArchive – season summaries

1885 in English cricket
English cricket seasons in the 19th century